Syed Mohammad Nasir Zaidi (born 25 March 1961) is a former cricketer for Karachi and Lancashire. Born in Karachi, Pakistan, Nasir was a right-hand batsman and leg break bowler. He played for Karachi in the 1980–81 season, though made only one one day appearance, then elected to move to England, where he trialed for the Second XI of Glamorgan, and Middlesex before Lancashire Second XI in 1983. He appeared for the Lancashire First XI from 1983 until 1985, playing 19 matches, scoring 313 runs and taking 19 wickets. After Lancashire he played Minor County cricket for Norfolk until 1986.

References

External links
 

1961 births
Cricketers from Karachi
Pakistani cricketers
Lancashire cricketers
Karachi cricketers
Norfolk cricketers
Living people